North Adelaide Golf Course is a 54 hole golf course in Adelaide, South Australia. The golf course is situated in the park lands which surround the City of Adelaide. The course consists of three courses, the Par 69 North Course, the Par 71 South Course, and an 18 hole Par 3 course. The North Adelaide Golf Course is perhaps the only golf course of its size to be located only a kilometre away from the business heart of a capital city.

History 
Golf has a long history in the Adelaide park lands, stretching back to 1870, 34 years after the European settlement of Adelaide. Before 1870, there is no known record of golf having been played in South Australia. Sir James Fergusson was appointed as governor of South Australia in 1868, and upon his arrival in Adelaide in 1869 set about establishing Adelaide's first golf club with David Murray and several other men. This golf club played its inaugural game of golf on May 15th 1870 with two rounds of a seven-hole course in what is now Park 16 (Victoria Park / Pakapakanthi) of the Adelaide park lands. A nine-hole course was briefly established, but ultimately this early golf club was to be short lived, becoming defunct around 1876 following the departure of Governor Fergusson in 1873. 

The North Adelaide Golf Club was formed in 1890 by William Pope and a group of professional men who lived in North Adelaide and the surrounding areas. This club played on a nine-hole course established at Montefiore Hill in modern-day Park 27 (Bonython Park / Tulya Wardli) of the Adelaide park lands. Cows, which had the run of the park lands at the time, were a frequent hazard on this early course. Fences were erected around the greens to prevent damage from grazing cattle, and local rules allowed golfers to take a mulligan if the fencing interfered with a shot. Players were also permitted to lift their ball from cow pats without incurring a penalty stroke.

In 1905 the North Adelaide Golf Course was officially opened as a municipal course. In 1921 the Adelaide City Council took over the original 9-hole course, extending it to 18-holes and creating the second public course of its kind in Australia (after Moore Park in Sydney). In 1950, holes on the existing course were reshuffled as the second 18-hole course was constructed in modern-day Park 1 (Possum Park / Pirltawardli). In 1959 the names of the courses were changed from No.1 and No.2 to North and South, respectively. In 1960 the 18 hole Par 3 course was opened as the first of its kind in Australia. Several holes have been realigned in the intervening years, and club membership waxed and waned. In 2005 the North Adelaide Golf Club celebrated its 100th year as a municipal golf club.

Features 
South Course

The championship style South Course is a Par 71 measuring in at 5884 meters in length. From the ladies tees the course is a 5404 metre Par 73. The course features a variety of holes, from Par 3s to Par 5s. Mature trees line the Santa Ana couch tees, Kikuyu grass fairways, and Bent grass greens.

North Course

The short but challenging North Course is a Par 69 measuring in at 4534 metres in length. From the ladies tees the course is a 4320 metre Par 70. It hosts a mix of short, tight holes and longer, open fairways.

Par 3 Course

The North Adelaide Golf Course Par 3 sits between the River Torrens and War Memorial Drive, and hosts 18 holes ranging in length from 56 to 140 metres. Tee's are of synthetic turf while the fairways and greens are Kikuyu grass, and Bent grass as in the North and South Courses.

References

External links 

 North Adelaide Golf Course Official Website
 North Adelaide Golf Club Official Website

Sports venues in Adelaide
Sporting clubs in Adelaide
Golf clubs and courses in South Australia
Sports venues completed in 1890
1890 establishments in Australia
North Adelaide